Damien Jacques Comolli (born 24 November 1971) is a French former football coach and scout and the current director of football of Toulouse FC. He has previously worked with the clubs Monaco, Saint-Étienne, Arsenal, Tottenham Hotspur, Liverpool and Fenerbahçe. He speaks fluent English, Spanish and French, and has been president of Toulouse FC since 20 July 2020.

Early life and career
Comolli was born in Béziers, France, and played as a youth team player at Monaco. In 1992, he began a three-year coaching job with Monaco, where he looked after the club's under-16 squads and won the state championship at that level. Comolli completed a law degree in 1995 and gained his French coaching licence.

Arsenal
In 1996, Comolli joined Arsenal and spent seven seasons as a European scout and is credited with the discovery of several of Arsenal's players such as Kolo Touré, Emmanuel Eboué and Gaël Clichy. Between 2004 and 2005, he was technical director of Saint-Étienne. The club went through a successful period, finishing sixth in the league and reaching the semi-finals of the Coupe de France. During his time there, he also oversaw a number of important first team signings and developed partnerships with junior and amateur clubs, locally, nationally and internationally.

Tottenham Hotspur
In 2005, Comolli became director of football at Tottenham Hotspur, with overall responsibility for the medical, academy, scouting and club secretarial departments, replacing the outgoing Frank Arnesen. During his time there, he had several disagreements with first-team head coach Martin Jol, who, after his departure from Spurs, complained several players had been signed by Comolli without his agreement and that they had left the squad "unbalanced".

Comolli spent three years in the job but with Tottenham performing poorly in 2008–09 and some of Comolli's signings coming in for criticism, he was dismissed in October 2008, shortly after the dismissals of manager Juande Ramos, assistant Gus Poyet and first team coach Marcos Álvarez, as the director of football position was abolished at the insistence of incoming manager Harry Redknapp. During his time at Tottenham, Comolli was responsible for Tottenham's policy of signing young talents. Comolli was also responsible for the signings of former Tottenham first-team squad members Luka Modrić, Benoît Assou-Ekotto, Heurelho Gomes, David Bentley, Vedran Ćorluka and Roman Pavlyuchenko, as well as Dimitar Berbatov.

Saint-Étienne
On 9 November 2008, it was announced that Comolli would return to Saint-Étienne as sporting director. His appointment led to the departure of manager Laurent Roussey. After leaving Saint-Étienne for Liverpool, the club's co-chairman Bernard Caiazzo said that Comolli was responsible for causing the club's financial problem and told the News of the World:

Liverpool
On 3 November 2010, Comolli's appointment as director of football strategy at Liverpool was announced, with part of his remit being to oversee the recruitment of new players to the club. Comolli made an instant impact at Liverpool as he was responsible for the signings of two players, Luis Suárez and Andy Carroll, in January 2011's transfer deadline day, with Carroll's signing breaking the record for most expensive British player ever and eighth most expensive player in history, overtaking Wayne Rooney. On 22 March 2011, Comolli was appointed as the director of football at Liverpool. In an interview, he stated the role covers pretty much the whole football side of running the football club, although he does not get involved in team training or selection.

In the summer transfer window for the 2011–12 season, Comolli helped Liverpool sign Jordan Henderson, Charlie Adam, Stewart Downing, Doni, José Enrique, Sebastián Coates and Craig Bellamy. On 12 April 2012, Comolli left Liverpool by mutual consent. After leaving Liverpool, Comolli spoke out defending the club's record.

References

1971 births
Living people
Sportspeople from Béziers
Association football scouts
French expatriate sportspeople in Turkey
Association football coaches
Tottenham Hotspur F.C. non-playing staff
Arsenal F.C. non-playing staff
Liverpool F.C. non-playing staff
French people of Italian descent
Association footballers not categorized by position
French expatriate sportspeople in England
AS Saint-Étienne non-playing staff
Fenerbahçe S.K. (football) non-playing staff
Toulouse FC non-playing staff